The Country Bear Christmas Special is a special holiday edition of the Country Bear Jamboree attraction. The show debuted at Disneyland at the Disneyland Resort and at Magic Kingdom at the Walt Disney World Resort in the winter of 1984, while marking the first time an attraction at any Disney theme park to ever receive a seasonal overlay. The show later premiered at Tokyo Disneyland at the Tokyo Disney Resort as Jingle Bell Jamboree during the 1988 Christmas season.

At the Disneyland Resort, the Christmas special stopped after 2000 since the Country Bear Playhouse closed on September 9, 2001. At Disney World, the Christmas special ended after the 2005 Christmas season. The holiday overlay of the show still plays at Tokyo Disneyland during their seasonal Christmas events every year (Except 2020, Due to the COVID-19 pandemic).

Characters
Because the show is a Christmas special, the characters in the show were put into holiday outfits for their various acts.

Bears
Henry - The Master of Ceremonies of the show, Henry is a welcoming and friendly brown bear. He wears a grey top hat with a red trim and a light green scarf. In some parts of the show, he played a yellow guitar. He is voiced by Pete Renaday.

Liver Lips McGrowl - Liver Lips is perhaps the funniest-looking bear. He is a brown bear who got his name from his very large lips. In this show, he becomes an Elvis impersonator wearing an Elvis-style Santa suit with gold chains around his neck and wears a fancy ring while playing a Christmas tree-shaped electric guitar and is voiced by Dave Durham.

Wendell - Wendell is a brown bear with a massive overbite and buck teeth. In this show, he carries a squirrel gun, which he accidentally fires a couple of times throughout the show. He wears a hunter's hat and jacket. His voice is provided by Dave Durham.

Teddi Berra - Teddi Berra is a unique bear because she never appears onstage. Instead, she descends from a hole in the ceiling on her swing. She is a brown bear who holds a pair of skis, has a cast on her leg and is dressed in ski gear. She is voiced by Genia Fuller.

Ernest - Ernest is a brown bear who plays the fiddle. In this show, he wears a beanie cap and sweater with a trim of reindeers in the middle and has a sled sitting next to him. He is voiced by Mike Weston.

Terrence (aka Shaker) - A tall bear who plays a guitar. In this show, he resembles a polar bear while wearing a scarf and earmuffs. He is also accompanied by a penguin encased in ice. His singing voice is provided by Harry Middlebrooks.

Trixie - Trixie is a very large brown bear who wears a blue bow on her head, a blue tutu around her waist, a pair of skates hanging from her neck and holds a pair of mittens in one hand and a mistletoe in another. In this show, she is voiced by Suzanne Sherwin.

Big Al - Big Al is the fattest bear. He is grey with a light grey belly and plays the guitar. In this show, he's dressed as Baby New Year (sash and diapers only used in the U.S. version) and wears an icepack and a party hat on his head. A banner hang above him. His voice is provided by Peter Klimes.

The Sun Bonnet Trio
 Bunny - Bunny stands in the center of the stage. Because she and her sisters are triplets, they all have brown fur. She wears a green hood and sweater with her name on it. She is voiced by Dianne Michelle.
 Bubbles - Bubbles stands to the audience's left between Gomer and Bunny. She wears a red hood and sweater with her name on it and is voiced by Lori Johnson.
 Beulah - Beulah stands to the audience's right. She wears a red hood and sweater with her name on it and is voiced by Holaday Mason.

Gomer - Gomer never sings, but instead he would play his piano, which had a small Christmas tree on top of it and Christmas decorations. He's considered Henry's right-hand bear. He is tall and brown and wears a heavy winter coat and sunglasses.

The Five Bear Rugs
 Zeke - Considered the leader of The Five Bear Rugs, Zeke plays a banjo and tapped on the dishpan with "a real ol' country beat". He is a grey bear with glasses who wears a black hat with snow on top of it and yellow scarf. He is voiced by Harry Middlebrooks.
 Zeb - Zeb is brown bear with a light brown stomach. He plays the fiddle as well and wears a bandana around his neck and a winter hat. His feet are in a hot bucket of water, due to having a cold and sneezes several times throughout the show. His speaking voice is provided by Curt Wilson while his singing is provided by Rod Burton
 Ted - Ted is a tall, skinny brown bear who blows on the cornjug and plays the washboard. He wears a white vest and a red Santa Claus hat.
 Fred - The biggest of The Five Bear Rugs, Fred ironically plays the smallest instrument: the mouth harp (a harmonica). He is a brown bear who wears blue jeans that are held up with red suspenders as well as a red Santa Claus hat and a green tie with a candy cane on it.
 Tennessee - Tennessee Bear plays "The Thing" (an upright bass with only one string and a tiny bird sitting on it). He is brown and wears a hunter's jacket and red hat. His now-deep voice is provided by Lee Dresser.

Baby Oscar - Oscar appears with The Five Bear Rugs, but plays no instrument. He is a brown bear and always has his teddy bear to keep him company. In this show, Oscar wears white earmuffs and red boots and holds a candy cane. His teddy bear has a tag with his name on it.

Rufus - Rufus is not a performer, but instead ran the projections and lights. He is never seen, but can be heard from time to time running backstage, constantly out of breath.

Other animals
Buff - Buff is considered the leader of the animal heads and is also the largest. He is the head portion of an American bison. In this show, he wears a red Santa Claus hat and is voiced by Disney legend Thurl Ravenscroft.

Max - Max is the head portion of a whitetail buck. In this show, he has a small red light bulb sitting on his snout, making him look a bit like Rudolph the Red-Nosed Reindeer. He was voiced by Mike West.

Melvin - Melvin is the bull moose head of the animal head trio, he often makes good-natured jokes. In this show, he has many Christmas lights hanging on his antlers. He is voiced by Frank Welker.

Sammy - Sammy is Henry's raccoon pal, who cuddles around Henry's top hat. He acts like a coonskin cap for Henry. In this show, he wears a piece of a Christmas leaf next to his right ear. He is voiced by Bob Gardner.

Show
The show includes many different traditional Christmas carols, more modern songs, along with some original Christmas "bear-ols" all sung by the bears in a country twang. The show begins as always with Melvin, Buff, and Max. As the three argued over who gets to sing "Rudolph the Red-Nosed Reindeer", Henry appears onstage and starts the show.

Songs
American version:
 "Rudolph the Red-Nosed Reindeer" - Melvin
 "It's Beginning to Look a Lot Like Christmas" - Henry and Gomer
 "Tracks in the Snow" - The 5 Bear Rugs and Henry
 "12 Days of Christmas (Oh What a Christmas)" - Wendell
 "The Hibernating Blues" - Trixie
 "Deck the Halls" - The 5 Bear Rugs
 "Rock and Roll Santa" - Liver Lips McGrowl and Gomer
 "Blue Christmas" - Terrence (with his penguin)
 "Sleigh Ride" - The Sun Bonnets, Melvin, Buff, and Max
 "Hungry as a Bear" - Ernest and The 5 Bear Rugs
 "The Christmas Song" - Henry and Teddi Barra
 "Another New Year" - Big Al
 "Let It Snow/Rudolph the Red-Nosed Reindeer/Winter Wonderland" - Cast (except Ernest & Trixie as she is on the opposite side of the performing Henry and Ernest is opposite Big Al's stage)

Japanese version:
 "Rudolph the Red-Nosed Reindeer" - Melvin (sung in Japanese)
 "Jingle Bells" - Henry and Gomer (sung in Japanese)
 "Tracks in the Snow" - The 5 Bear Rugs and Henry (sung in Japanese)
 "12 Days of Christmas (Oh What a Christmas)" - Wendell (sung in Japanese)
 "Have Yourself a Merry Little Christmas" - Trixie (sung in English)
 "Deck the Halls" - The 5 Bear Rugs (sung in Japanese)
 "Rock and Roll Santa" - Liver Lips McGrowl and Gomer (sung in English)
 "Blue Christmas" - Terrence (with his penguin) (sung in Japanese)
 "Sleigh Ride" - The Sun Bonnets, Melvin, Buff, and Max (sung in English)
 "Hungry as a Bear" - Ernest and The 5 Bear Rugs (sung in Japanese)
 "The Christmas Song" - Henry and Teddi Barra (sung in English)
 "Auld Lang Syne" - Big Al (sung in English)
 "Santa Claus Is Coming to Town/"Rudolph the Red-Nosed Reindeer/Winter Wonderland" - Cast (except Ernest & Trixie as she is on the opposite side of the performing Henry and Ernest is opposite Big Al's stage) (sung in Japanese until Winter Wonderland which is in English).

See also 

 It's a Small World Holiday (tokyo disneyland and disneyland) (they sing jingle bells and deck the halls (Final))
 Haunted Mansion Holiday (Tokyo Disneyland and Disneyland)

References

Walt Disney Parks and Resorts attractions
Amusement park attractions introduced in 1984
Amusement park attractions that closed in 2005
Amusement park attractions introduced in 1988
Amusement park attractions introduced in 2000
Amusement park attractions that closed in 2001
Audio-Animatronic attractions
Disneyland
Magic Kingdom
Tokyo Disneyland